Salim Aribi (born 16 December 1974 in Batna) is a retired Algerian footballer.

He was part of the Algerian 2004 African Nations Cup team, who finished second in their group in the first round of competition before being defeated by Morocco in the quarter-finals.

National team statistics

References

External links

1974 births
Living people
People from Batna, Algeria
Chaoui people
Algerian footballers
Algeria international footballers
USM Alger players
CA Batna players
2004 African Cup of Nations players
Association football defenders
21st-century Algerian people